TSG 1899 Hoffenheim Frauen is the women's football section of German club TSG 1899 Hoffenheim, based in Hoffenheim, a village of Sinsheim municipality, Baden-Württemberg, inside the Rhine-Neckar. The team currently plays in the Frauen-Bundesliga, the highest level of women's football in Germany.

History
The team started playing in 2007 and rushed through the lower leagues. It plays at Dietmar-Hopp-Stadion and is currently coached by Gabor Gallai.

Players

Current squad

Former players

Seasons

Key

References

External links

Women's football clubs in Germany
Football clubs in Baden-Württemberg
Association football clubs established in 2007
Women
2007 establishments in Germany
Frauen-Bundesliga clubs